Beaucamps-Ligny is a commune in the Nord department in northern France. It was formed by the merger of Beaucamps and Ligny-en-Weppes in 1927.

Population

Heraldry

See also
Communes of the Nord department

References

Communes of Nord (French department)
French Flanders